"Love You Only" is the debut single by the Japanese band Tokio and was released on September 21, 1994. It reached third place on the Oricon weekly charts, and charted for 22 weeks. It was also the 3rd opening theme song to the anime "Tsuyoshi! Shikkari Shinasai!" In addition to being included in the album Tokio, it was remixed for the album TOK10.

Track listing

References

1994 debut singles
Tokio (band) songs
1994 songs
Sony Music Entertainment Japan singles